A jaleo is an Andalusian song genre, and clapping applause in flamenco.

Jaleo may also refer to:

El Jaleo, an 1882 painting by John Singer Sargent
Jaleos, a 1996 dance production by Víctor Ullate
"Jaleo" (Ricky Martin song)
"Jaleo" (Nicky Jam and Steve Aoki song)